In mathematics, a Hirzebruch surface is a ruled surface over the projective line.

Definition
The Hirzebruch surface  is the -bundle, called a Projective bundle, over  associated to the sheafThe notation here means:  is the -th tensor power of the Serre twist sheaf , the invertible sheaf or line bundle with associated Cartier divisor a single point.

GIT quotient 

Transition maps 
One way to construct this -bundle is by using transition functions.

Properties

Projective rank 2 bundles over P1 
Note that the projective bundleis equivalent to a Hirzebruch surface since projective bundles are invariant after tensoring by a line bundle. In particular, this is associated to the Hirzebruch surface  since this bundle can be tensored by the line bundle .

Isomorphisms of Hirzebruch surfaces 

Analysis of associated symmetric algebra 
Recall that projective bundles can be constructed using Relative Proj, which is formed from the graded sheaf of algebrasThe first few symmetric modules are special since there is a non-trivial anti-symmetric -module . These sheaves are summarized in the tableFor  the symmetric sheaves are given by

Properties

This curve has self-intersection number , and is the only irreducible curve with negative self intersection number. The only irreducible curves with zero self intersection number are the fibers of the Hirzebruch surface (considered as a fiber bundle over ). The Picard group is generated by the curve  and one of the fibers, and these generators have intersection matrix

so the bilinear form is two dimensional unimodular, and is even or odd depending on whether  is even or odd.

The Hirzebruch surface  blown up at a point on the special curve  is isomorphic to  blown up at a point not on the special curve.

See also 

 Projective bundle

References

External links 
 Manifold Atlas
https://www.mathematik.uni-kl.de/~gathmann/class/alggeom-2002/alggeom-2002-c10.pdf
https://mathoverflow.net/q/122952

Algebraic surfaces
Complex surfaces